Suita Station (吹田駅) is the name of two train stations in Suita, Osaka, Japan:

 Suita Station (JR West)
 Suita Station (Hankyu)